Lonnie Walker IV (born December 14, 1998) is an American professional basketball player for the Los Angeles Lakers of the National Basketball Association (NBA). He played high school basketball for Reading Senior High School in Reading, Pennsylvania. He signed a letter of intent to continue his academic and athletic career at the University of Miami. In January 2017, Walker was selected as a McDonald's All-American.

High school career
Walker attended Reading Senior High School in Reading, Pennsylvania. Walker made his varsity basketball debut as a freshman and played 27 games averaging eight points per game, and later as a sophomore he averaged 16.9 points per game in a short season due to injury. In 29 games, as a junior, he averaged 17.1 points per game. During his senior year, he averaged a career best 18.4 points per game and surpassed Reading High grad and former NBA player Donyell Marshall's school record in points by finishing with 1,828 total points scored. On March 25, 2017, Walker led Reading Senior High School to their first state championship in the program's 117-year history in a 64-60 win over the Pine-Richland Rams. Walker finished the game with 22 points, eight rebounds, four steals, and three assists. 

During the season, Walker signed with the Miami Hurricanes, passing on other scholarship offers from Villanova, Kentucky, Syracuse, and Arizona.

College career
Walker made his collegiate debut with the Miami Hurricanes on November 10, 2017, recording 10 points and a season-high five assists coming off the bench in a 77–45 blowout win over Gardner-Webb University. He created new highs of 12 points and 5 rebounds on December 2 in an 80–52 blowout win against Princeton University before recording season-highs of 26 points and 7 rebounds during his first collegiate start three days later in a 69–54 win over Boston University. Against Louisville, he scored a game-high 25 points including an acrobatic layup in traffic to force overtime. In a game against Boston College, he hit a 3-pointer with two seconds remaining to win 79-78. Walker finished the season averaging 11.5 points per game and was named to the Atlantic Coast Conference (ACC) All-freshman team.

After his sole season with Miami concluded, Walker declared for the 2018 NBA draft.

Professional career

San Antonio Spurs (2018–2022)
On June 21, 2018, Walker was selected with the 18th overall pick by the San Antonio Spurs in the 2018 NBA draft. Walker was later included in the 2018 NBA Summer League roster of the Spurs. On July 11, 2018, the Spurs announced that they signed Walker. On October 6, 2018, Walker was revealed to have a right medial meniscus tear. On November 25, 2018, the San Antonio Spurs assigned Walker the first time of the season to the Austin Spurs. Walker made his NBA debut on January 3, 2019 in a 125–107 win against the Toronto Raptors, scoring three points and grabbing one rebound in five minutes of play.

On December 3, 2019, Walker scored a career-high 28 points, including 19 in the 4th quarter, in a 135–133 double overtime win over the Houston Rockets with four rebounds, three steals and a block.

Los Angeles Lakers (2022–present)
On July 6, 2022, Walker signed with the Los Angeles Lakers on a one-year, $6.5M contract.

Career statistics

NBA

Regular season

|-
| style="text-align:left;"|
| style="text-align:left;"|San Antonio
| 17 || 0 || 6.9 || .348 || .385 || .800 || 1.0 || .5 || .4 || .2 || 2.6
|-
| style="text-align:left;"| 
| style="text-align:left;"| San Antonio
| 61 || 12 || 16.2 || .426 || .406 || .721 || 2.3 || 1.1 || .5 || .2 || 6.4
|-
| style="text-align:left;"| 
| style="text-align:left;"| San Antonio
| 60 || 38 || 25.4 || .420 || .355 || .814 || 2.6 || 1.7 || .5 || .3 || 11.2
|-
| style="text-align:left;"| 
| style="text-align:left;"| San Antonio
| 70 || 6 || 23.0 || .407 || .314 || .784 || 2.6 || 2.2 || .6 || .3 || 12.1
|- class="sortbottom"
| style="text-align:center;" colspan="2"|Career
| 208 || 56 || 20.4 || .414 || .343 || .779 || 2.4 || 1.6 || .5 || .2 || 9.4

Playoffs

|-
| style="text-align:left;"|2019
| style="text-align:left;"|San Antonio
| 6 || 1 || 3.5|| .375|| .300 ||  || .3 || .5 || .7 || .9|| 1.0
|- class="sortbottom"
| style="text-align:center;" colspan="2"|Career
| 6 || 1 || 3.5|| .375|| .300 ||  || .3 || .5 || .7 || .9 || 1.0

College

|-
| style="text-align:left;"|2017–18
| style="text-align:left;"|Miami
| 32 || 18 || 27.8 || .415 || .346 || .738 || 2.6 || 1.9 || .9 || .5 || 11.5

Personal life
Walker has a dog named Zola, who appeared with him in a PETA ad campaign, reminding people not to leave their dogs in hot, parked cars.

In June 2020, Walker revealed he had been the victim of abuse by family members as an adolescent, and had grown out his trademark long hairstyle as a coping mechanism. In deciding to cut his hair, Walker described the act as having "shed my skin mentally, emotionally, physically and spiritually."

References

External links
 
 Los Angeles Lakers bio
 Miami Hurricanes bio
 

1998 births
Living people
21st-century African-American sportspeople
African-American basketball players
American men's basketball players
Austin Spurs players
Basketball players from Pennsylvania
Los Angeles Lakers players
McDonald's High School All-Americans
Miami Hurricanes men's basketball players
San Antonio Spurs draft picks
San Antonio Spurs players
Shooting guards
Small forwards
Sportspeople from Reading, Pennsylvania